Vladislav Jonima ( 1303–19) was an Albanian nobleman that initially served Serbian King Stefan Milutin (r. 1282–1321), holding areas of the Kingdom of Serbia in the region of Doclea and northern Albania. He was last mentioned in 1319, as a participant of a Catholic coalition of the Kingdom of Albania led by Philip of Taranto (r. 1294–1332, seemingly having switched sides against Milutin. He is an ancestor of the Jonima family.

Croatian historian Milan Šufflay (1879–1931) treated him as undoubtedly a descendant of sevast Jonima, mentioned in Angevin sources dating to 1274. Swiss historian Oliver Schmitt (born 1973) regards his Slavic name and position in a Slavic-dominated state, as an Albanian, a sign of close relations between the two ethnic groups in the region. 
In 1303 he appears present in the Serbian court. In 1306 he held the title of župan in the service of Serbian King Stefan Milutin; Jonima was among the witnesses mentioned in a charter issued to Ratac by Milutin in 1306. His rank in the hierarchy of the Serbian Kingdom was below the rank of kaznac Miroslav and čelnik Branko.

Mentioned in a papal bull of 1319, Philip I, Prince of Taranto, who claimed the title Latin Emperor, had succeeded in uniting many lords in  the Kingdom of Albania (barones regni Albanie) south of Scutari: William Arianit, Paul Matarango, count Vladislav Jonima, count Mentol Musachi, commander Andrew Musachi, protosebastos Theodore Musachi, protosebastos William Blenist and count Kaloyan Blenist. Jonima was mentioned as a "count of Doclea and coastal Albania" (dilecto filio Bladislao Gonome, Dioclee et Maritime Albanie comiti). The areas under his control appear to be related with the promotion of Catholicism by Queen Helen of Anjou. According to some this alliance was set against the Serbian Kingdom.

Annotations

References

Sources

14th-century Albanian people
People of the Kingdom of Serbia (medieval)
Vladislav
Albanian Roman Catholics
14th-century Serbian nobility
13th-century births
14th-century deaths